The Europäische Föderation Radiogesteuerter Automodelle (EFRA), better known in English as the European Federation of Radio Operated Model Automobiles, is the governing body of radio-controlled car racing in Europe.

History 

Setup in May 1973, EFRA's original members were France, Germany, the Netherlands, Italy, Switzerland and Yugoslavia. They established a set of rules which did was not approved by the British. After discussion, BRCA's Ron Moody withdrew their membership. The idea of organisation was to regulate radio-controlled car racing though Europe. Although each member country would retain their own governing body, EFRA would try to make homogenous rules which form the basis of most of the rules in each member country, and also for European championship racing.

EFRA was chosen as it could be adapted by a large number of each member counties languages. In English, for the British membership, European Federation Of Radio Operated Model Automobiles is what is used to define EFRA.

Purpose

EFRA now has 32 member countries and represents Europe in IFMAR (International Federation of Model Auto Racing). Just as EFRA represent European countries, IFMAR represents these larger groups such as EFRA.

EFRA provides list of approved components such as engines and tuned pipes for use in model cars. It also governs racing of the European Championships for radio controlled car racing, which caters for most classes of models.

Secretariat

Presidents

Members
 
 
 
Member country, followed by the governing body is that country where known or applicable.

References

Works cited

External links
Official site

European sports federations
Radio-controlled car racing organizations